In statistics, the interclass correlation (or interclass correlation coefficient) measures a relation between two variables of different classes (types), such as the weights of 10-year-old sons and the weights of their 40-year-old fathers. Deviations of a variable are measured from the mean of the data for that class – a son’s weight minus the mean of all the sons’ weights, or a father’s weight minus the mean of all the fathers’ weights.

The Pearson correlation coefficient is the most commonly used measure of interclass correlation.

The interclass correlation contrasts with the intraclass correlation between variables of the same class, such as the weights of women and of their identical twins; here deviations are measured from the mean of all members of the single class: in this example of all women in the set of identical twins.

References

  There are several errors in the article:
 

Covariance and correlation
Inter-rater reliability